Kurt Hennrich (28 August 1931 – 28 July 2020) was a Czech alpine skier. He competed in three events at the 1956 Winter Olympics. Hennrich was an ethnic German.

References

External links
 

1931 births
2020 deaths
Czech male alpine skiers
Olympic alpine skiers of Czechoslovakia
Alpine skiers at the 1956 Winter Olympics
People from Chomutov District
Sudeten German people
Sportspeople from the Ústí nad Labem Region